Family of Scatterable Mines (FASCAM) is an umbrella term for a range of systems of the armed forces of the United States, which allows a maneuver commander to rapidly place mines as a situational obstacle; as a reserve obstacle emplacement capability; and to directly attack enemy formations through disrupt, fix, turn, and block. Modern fusing, sensing, and anti-disturbance devices allow scatterable mines to defeat enemy attempts to reduce and/or clear the minefield. FASCAM mines are delivered through artillery,  rocket launchers, indirect crew served weapons, special mine sowing vehicles, helicopters and aircraft.  FASCAM mines utilize a random or pre-programmed self-destruct period, countermeasure hardening and anti-disturbance features. All FASCAM mines have an active life cycle and self-destruct (SD) time after their active life has expired. The duration of the active life varies from 4 hours to 15 days depending on the system.

Systems that are part of the FASCAM range include:
 Remote Anti-Armor Mine System (RAAMS) (a 155mm howitzer shell)
 Area Denial Artillery Munition (ADAM) (a 155mm howitzer shell)
 GATOR mine system (air dropped)
 Volcano mine system (various vehicles)
 GEMSS mine system (various vehicles)
 Modular Pack Mine System (MOPMS) (a manually emplaced mine dispenser consisting of 17 AT and 4 AP mines released on command from a remote control system)

References

Land mines of the United States